Legislative elections were held in France on 21 October 1945 to elect a Constituent Assembly to draft a constitution for a Fourth French Republic. 79.83% of voters participated. Women and soldiers were allowed to vote. 522 seats were elected through proportional representation.

Parties and issues
On 21 October 1945, the French voters were called to make two choices: the election of their deputies and a referendum in order to authorize the elected National Assembly to prepare a new constitutional text. De Gaulle and the "Three parties alliance" called for a "Yes" vote, whereas the Radicals and the Conservatives campaigned for a "No".

Symbol of the French Resistance to the German occupation and founder of the Free French Forces General Charles de Gaulle led a provisional government composed of the three main political forces of the Resistance: the French Communist Party (PCF), the French Section of the Workers' International (socialists, SFIO) and the Christian democratic Popular Republican Movement (MRP). It advocated an economic policy inspired by the programme of the National Council of Resistance: the creation of a Welfare State, and the nationalization of banks and major industrial companies (such as Renault). The opposition was composed of the parties which had dominated the pre-war governments of the Third Republic: the Radical Party and the classical Right.

Results

Referendum
The "Yes" won by 96% of the votes. This result reflected the support for the provisional government and the popular will for change.

National Assembly
Unsurprisingly, the "Three-parties alliance" won a large majority in the National Assembly. The Radical Party, which had been the leading party of the left in the Third Republic, suffered a catastrophic result, and the right was equally destroyed (because of its support of Marshal Philippe Pétain). They appeared as being the forces of the past, as symbols of capitulation to Nazi Germany and the regime which collapsed in 1940. The French Communist Party, which had already doubled its score in the previous 1936 elections, came out on top with around 26% of votes and 159 seats. While the PCF and SFIO favored a unicameral parliamentary regime, the MRP favored a bicameral legislature. De Gaulle advocated a presidential government. He resigned in January 1946. The PCF and SFIO proposals were rejected in the 5 May 1946 referendum. This assembly was dissolved.

|-
! style="background-color:#E9E9E9;text-align:left;vertical-align:top;" colspan=2 |Parties and coalitions
! style="background-color:#E9E9E9;text-align:right;" | Abbr.
! style="background-color:#E9E9E9;text-align:right;" | Votes
! style="background-color:#E9E9E9;text-align:right;" | %
! style="background-color:#E9E9E9;text-align:right;" | Seats
|-
|style="background-color:#FF0000"|
| style="text-align:left;" | French Communist Party (Parti communiste français)
| style="text-align:right;" | PCF
| style="text-align:right;" | 5,005,336
| style="text-align:right;" | 26.1
| style="text-align:right;" | 148
|-
|style="background-color:#00CCCC"|
| style="text-align:left;" | Popular Republican Movement (Mouvement républicain populaire)
| style="text-align:right;" | MRP
| style="text-align:right;" | 4,780,338 	
| style="text-align:right;" | 24.9
| style="text-align:right;" | 141
|-
|style="background-color:#E75480"|
| style="text-align:left;" | French Section of the Workers International (Section française de l'Internationale ouvrière)
| style="text-align:right;" | SFIO
| style="text-align:right;" | 4,561,411 	
| style="text-align:right;" | 23.8
| style="text-align:right;" | 134
|-
|
| style="text-align:left;" | Total "Three-parties alliance"
|
| style="text-align:right;" | 14,347,085
| style="text-align:right;" | 74.8
| style="text-align:right;" | 423
|-
|style="background-color:#1E90FF"|
| style="text-align:left;" | Conservatives (Democratic Alliance, National Centre of Independents and Peasants, Republican Party of Liberty and others)
| style="text-align:right;" | DA/CNI
| style="text-align:right;" | 2,545,845 	
| style="text-align:right;" | 13.3
| style="text-align:right;" | 62
|-
|style="background-color:#FFBF00"|
| style="text-align:left;" | Radical Socialists (Parti radical-socialiste) (including Independents of the Left and others)
| style="text-align:right;" | Rad./IG
| style="text-align:right;" | 2,131,763 	 	
| style="text-align:right;" | 11.1
| style="text-align:right;" | 35
|-
|
| style="text-align:left;" | Miscellaneous
|
| style="text-align:right;" |165,106 
| style="text-align:right;" | 0.9
| style="text-align:right;" | 2
|-
|
| style="text-align:left;" | Invalid/blank votes
|
| style="text-align:right;" | 467,804
| style="text-align:right;" |
| style="text-align:right;" | 
|-
| colspan=2 style="text-align:left;" | Total
|
| style="text-align:right;" | 19,657,603
| style="text-align:right;" | 100
| style="text-align:right;" | 522
|-
| colspan=6 style="text-align:left;" | Turnout: 81.85%
|-
|align=left colspan=4|Source: Nohlen & Stöver
|}

References

Further reading
Footitt, Hilary and John Simmonds. France, 1943–1945 (1988).
Graham, Bruce Desmond. The French socialists and tripartisme, 1944–1947 (University of Toronto Press, 1965).
Knapp, Andrew, ed. Uncertain Foundation: France at the Liberation 1944–47 (Palgrave Macmillan, 2007).

1945
1945 elections in France
October 1945 events in Europe
Articles containing video clips